Comolli may refer to:

Damien Comolli (born 1972), former football coach, scout and Director of Football
Giovanni Battista Comolli (1775–1831), Italian sculptor
Jean-Louis Comolli (1941–2022), French writer, editor, and film director
Jessica Comolli (born 1985), beauty queen from Montpelier, Vermont

See also
Comollo (surname)

Surnames of Italian origin